Bernard Nicolas Thierry Diomède (born 23 January 1974) is a French football manager and former professional player. He was most recently the manager of the France U20s. He played as a winger and won the World Cup with France in 1998.

Early life
Diomède was born in Saint-Doulchard, Cher, to parents of Guadeloupean descent.

Club career
Diomède's career began with AJ Auxerre. After playing at youth level for the club, he made his Division 1 debut in 1992. He played in the first team during eight years, under Guy Roux Auxerre won the Division 1 and Coupe de France double in 1996. The winger scored 30 goals in 175 Ligue 1 matches for Auxerre.

In June 2000, Diomède was signed for £3m by then Liverpool F.C. manager Gérard Houllier. Making his debut against Sunderland, Diomède appeared to have scored with an overhead kick, but the goal was not given even though replays showed that the ball had crossed the line. However, he did not settle in England, and only played five matches for Liverpool. In January 2003, he was loaned out to AC Ajaccio, newly promoted in France's Ligue 1, until the end of his contract. After his spell at Liverpool had come to an end, he joined the Ligue 2 team Créteil, and then Clermont Foot in the Championnat National (3rd division).

International career
Diomède was capped eight times for the France national team, but never scored. He received his first cap in a friendly against Spain on 28 January 1998. At the 1998 World Cup he started in three matches, against Saudi Arabia and Denmark in the group stage and against Paraguay in the round of 16. He was unable to regain his place in the France national team after the 1998 World Cup.

Retirement
On 18 January 2008, Diomède announced his retirement from the game after being without a club for 18 months.

He now runs the Bernard Diomede Football Academy at the Saint Nicolas high school in Issy-les-Moulineaux, just south of Paris.

Honours
Auxerre
Division 1: 1995–96
Coupe de France: 1995–96

France
FIFA World Cup: 1998

Orders
Knight of the Legion of Honour: 1998
Officer of the National Order of Merit: 2013

References

External links

 
 
LFC History Profile
FIFA Profile

1974 births
Living people
Sportspeople from Cher (department)
French footballers
France international footballers
Association football wingers
AJ Auxerre players
Liverpool F.C. players
AC Ajaccio players
US Créteil-Lusitanos players
Clermont Foot players
Ligue 1 players
Premier League players
Ligue 2 players
UEFA Cup winning players
1998 FIFA World Cup players
FIFA World Cup-winning players
French expatriate footballers
Expatriate footballers in England
French expatriate sportspeople in England
Black French sportspeople
Chevaliers of the Légion d'honneur
Officers of the Ordre national du Mérite
French people of Guadeloupean descent
Footballers from Centre-Val de Loire